USS Montauk (SP-1213) was a tugboat purchased by the U.S. Navy during World War I. She was assigned to towing duties in New York City waterways. Post-war she was decommissioned and sold.

History

The third ship to be so named by the U.S. Navy, Montauk (SP 1213), ex-Luckenbach No. 3, was built in 1899 by Neafie & Levy of Philadelphia, Pennsylvania; purchased by the Navy from the Luckenbach Steamship Company, 12 October 1917; and commissioned 6 December 1917.

Assigned to the 3d Naval District, the 434 gross ton tug operated out of New York City as a seagoing tug until 6 December 1919. Decommissioned the same month, Montauk was sold 21 May 1920 to the Bisso Towing Co.

References 
 
 USS Montauk (SP-1213), 1917-1920. Originally the Civilian tug Luckenbach # 3

World War I auxiliary ships of the United States
Tugs of the United States Navy
Ships built by Neafie and Levy
1899 ships